Elsebeth is a Danish female given name. It is the Danish form of Elizabeth. Notable people with this name include:

 Elsebeth Brehm (1901-1995), Danish tennis player
 Elsebeth Budolfsen (born 1947), Danish pharmacist
 Elsebeth Egholm (born 1960), Danish author
 Elsebeth Gerner Nielsen (born 1960), Danish politician
 Elsebeth Kock-Petersen (born 1949), Danish politician
 Elsebeth Mercedis Gunnleygsdóttur (born 1963), Faroese politician

Danish feminine given names